Weah may refer to:

 George Weah, Liberian politician and former football (soccer) forward, who was the FIFA World Player of the Year of 1995
 Clar Weah, Jamaican businesswoman, wife of George, mother of Timothy, and current first lady of Liberia
 George Weah Jr., American footballer, son of George and Clar
 Timothy Weah, American footballer, son of George and Clar
 Jester Weah, Liberian-American football player, nephew of George
 Stephen Weah, Liberian football (soccer) striker, cousin of George
 Edward Weah Dixon, Liberian-French footballer (midfielder)
 Patrick Weah, Liberian footballer
 Thierry Fidjeu-Tazemeta (also known as Weah), football striker from Cameroon